

Friedrich Mieth (4 June 1888 – 2 September 1944) was a German general during World War II. In 1942, he commanded Army Group Don Rear Area. Mieth was killed in action on 2 September 1944 in Iași, Romania.

Awards and decorations
 Iron Cross (1914) 2nd Class (17 September 1914) & 1st Class (11 March 1915)
 Clasp to the Iron Cross (1939) 2nd Class (29 October 1939) & 1st Class (4 February 1940)
 German Cross in Gold on 26 December 1941 as Generalleutnant and commander of the 112. Infanterie-Division
 Knight's Cross of the Iron Cross with Oak Leaves
 Knight's Cross on 2 November 1943 as General der Infanterie and commander of IV. Armeekorps
 Oak Leaves on 1 March 1944 as General der Infanterie and commander of IV. Armeekorps

References

Citations

Bibliography

 
 

 

1888 births
1944 deaths
People from Eberswalde
People from the Province of Brandenburg
Generals of Infantry (Wehrmacht)
German Army personnel of World War I
Recipients of the Knight's Cross of the Iron Cross with Oak Leaves
German Army  personnel killed in World War II
Reichswehr personnel
Military personnel from Brandenburg
German Army generals of World War II